Presidential elections were held for the first time in Algeria on 15 September 1963. Incumbent Ahmed Ben Bella of the National Liberation Front (the sole legal party) was the only candidate, and was re-elected with 99.6% of the vote, based on an 88.9% turnout.

Results

References

Algeria
1963 in Algeria
Presidential elections in Algeria
One-party elections
Single-candidate elections
September 1963 events in Africa